Second Street Bridge may refer to:

 Second Street Bridge (Little Rock, Arkansas)
 Second Street Bridge (Louisville, Kentucky) officially the George Rogers Clark Memorial Bridge, crosses between Louisville, Kentucky and Jeffersonville/Clarksville, Indiana
 Second Street Bridge (Allegan, Michigan) listed on the National Register of Historic Places (NRHP)
 Second Street Bridge (Chester, Pennsylvania), NRHP-listed
 Second Street Bridge (Galesville, Wisconsin), formerly listed on the National Register of Historic Places listings in Trempealeau County, Wisconsin

See also 
 Second Street–Gun River Bridge, Hooper, Michigan, NRHP-listed
 West Second Street–Swartz Creek Bridge, Flint, Michigan, NRHP-listed